Following is a list of justices of the Iowa Supreme Court.

References

Iowa
Justices